The 2016–17 Sacred Heart Pioneers men's basketball team represented Sacred Heart University during the 2016–17 NCAA Division I men's basketball season. This was the Pioneers' 18th season of NCAA Division I basketball, all played in the Northeast Conference. The Pioneers were led by fourth-year head coach Anthony Latina and played their home games at the William H. Pitt Center in Fairfield, Connecticut. They finished the season 13–19, 8–10 in NEC play to finish in eighth place. They lost in the quarterfinals of the NEC tournament to Mount St. Mary's.

Previous season 
The Pioneers finished the 2015–16 season 12–18, 11–7 in NEC play to finish in a three was tie for second place. They lost in the quarterfinals of the NEC tournament to LIU Brooklyn.

Roster

Schedule and results

|-
!colspan=9 style=| Non-conference regular season
 

 

|-
!colspan=9 style=| NEC Regular season

|-
!colspan=9 style=| NEC tournament

References 

Sacred Heart Pioneers men's basketball seasons
Sacred Heart
Sacred Heart Pioneers men's b
Sacred Heart Pioneers men's b